Kulič is a village in the municipality of Smederevo, Serbia.

Kulič may also refer to:

Kulič (surname)
Kulich (bread)

See also
Kulich (disambiguation)
Kulić, surname
Kulic (surname)